Mitev Glacier is the  long and  wide glacier on Brabant Island in the Palmer Archipelago, Antarctica situated east of Laennec Glacier. It drains the north slopes of Avroleva Heights and flows northeastwards to enter Hill Bay west of Petroff Point.

The glacier is named after the Bulgarian scientist Ivan Mitev (1924–2006) who discovered the sixth heart tone.

Location
British mapping in 1980.

See also
 List of glaciers in the Antarctic
 Glaciology

Maps
 Antarctic Digital Database (ADD). Scale 1:250000 topographic map of Antarctica. Scientific Committee on Antarctic Research (SCAR). Since 1993, regularly upgraded and updated.
British Antarctic Territory. Scale 1:200000 topographic map. DOS 610 Series, Sheet W 64 62. Directorate of Overseas Surveys, Tolworth, UK, 1980.
Brabant Island to Argentine Islands. Scale 1:250000 topographic map. British Antarctic Survey, 2008.

References
 Bulgarian Antarctic Gazetteer. Antarctic Place-names Commission. (details in Bulgarian, basic data in English)
 SCAR Composite Antarctic Gazetteer

External links
 Mitev Glacier. Copernix satellite image

Glaciers of the Palmer Archipelago
Bulgaria and the Antarctic
Brabant Island